Randpark is a suburb of the city of Johannesburg, South Africa. It is located in the northern suburbs  of the City of Johannesburg.

Randpark is a well established area that is quiet and forms part of an area with road closure for security reasons. It is bordered by several other suburbs including Windsor Glen, Robin Hills, Malanshof and Fontainebleau. It is located in the north-west of Johannesburg within the boundary of the N1 highway.

The suburb is residential, It is well planned and forms part of Johannesburg's sizable man-made forest.  It is also the location of the Randpark Golf Club which adds to the beauty of this area. It is proximate to the city centre, Sandton and Randburg and makes it a convenient area to live in.

The area is serviced by one highway, namely the N1 Western Bypass, which connects the vicinity to Sandton and Pretoria to the north and to Roodepoort and Soweto to the south. Major arterial routes include Republic Road and Malibongwe Drive (R512).

The closest shopping mall from the Randpark area is the Cresta shopping mall which is located on Republic Rd approx 3 kilometers from Randpark.

Randpark has no schools within its boundaries but there are many schools within surrounding areas including, Robin Hills Primary, Randpark Ridge High, Fontainebleau Laerskool and Randburg Hoërskool.

The only public transport from the area is buses and mini taxis.

References

Johannesburg Region B